Huntington is an unincorporated village and census-designated place (CDP) in the town of Huntington, Chittenden County, Vermont, United States. It was first listed as a CDP prior to the 2020 census.

The village is in southeastern Chittenden County, in the northwest part of the town of Huntington, in the valley of the Huntington River, a north-flowing tributary of the Winooski River. Camel's Hump rises  to the east on the crest of the Green Mountains.

References 

Populated places in Chittenden County, Vermont
Census-designated places in Chittenden County, Vermont
Census-designated places in Vermont